Ahamus yulongensis is a species of moth of the family Hepialidae. It was described by Liang et al. in 1988, and is known from Yunnan, China.

References

External links
Hepialidae genera

Moths described in 1988
Hepialidae
Moths of Asia